Adeuomphalus crenulatus is a species of sea snail, a marine gastropod mollusc, unassigned to family in the superfamily Seguenzioidea.

Distribution
This marine species occurs off New Zealand.

References

External links
 To Encyclopedia of Life
 To World Register of Marine Species

crenulatus
Gastropods described in 1937